The Trekking Sebring is a French single-place paraglider that was designed and produced by Trekking Parapentes of Lambesc. Introduced in 2003, it is now out of production.

Design and development
The Sebring was designed as an advanced cross country performance glider. The models are each named for their relative size.

Variants
Sebring S
Small-sized model for lighter pilots. The glider model is AFNOR Performance certified.
Sebring M
Mid-sized model for medium-weight pilots. The glider model is AFNOR Performance certified.
Sebring L
Large-sized model for heavier pilots. The glider model is AFNOR Performance certified.

Specifications (Sebring M)

References

Sebring
Paragliders